The Charles Cameron Memorial Fountain is a statue ensemble and drinking fountain in Glasgow, Scotland. Dating to 1896 and standing at the junction of Woodside Crescent and Sauchiehall Street, it is a Category B listed structure.

The fountain, designed by Clarke & Bell, is dedicated to Sir Charles Cameron MP. It is an ogee-domed baldacchino with basins at its base. It is in three stages, with a Peterhead granite base and basin and Doultonware for the two upper stages.

Although it no longer provides drinking water, the fountain has become notable for its pronounced eastward lean, which was first noted in 1926. An urban myth existed that the lean was caused by the construction of the M8 motorway in Glasgow.

Robert Alexander Bryden designed the clocktower dome which has clock faces at the cardinal points and bronze portrait medallions of Cameron around its hexagonal shape.

Gallery

See also
 List of public art in Glasgow

References

1896 sculptures
Fountains in the United Kingdom
Category B listed buildings in Glasgow
Listed sculptures in Scotland
Outdoor sculptures in Scotland